Unsolved murder is covered by several articles:

 Clearance rate
 Cold case
 List of unsolved deaths